FK Vindava is a former Latvian football club located in Ventspils. It was founded in 2007 on the basis of FK Honda, which got 4th place in 2006 in Latvian 2. līga, Kurzemes zona. In 2007 it won the 1. līga championships and was promoted to Virslīga. In 2008 season it placed 8th in Virslīga, but due to financial problems was dissolved in January 2009.

History 
Vindava (Windau) was the name of Ventspils before 1917.

Sport in Ventspils
Vindava
Vindava
2007 establishments in Latvia